Pandhurna is a city and a municipality in Chhindwara district in the Indian state of Madhya Pradesh.

Geography
It has an average elevation of 474 metres (1,555 feet).

Demographics
Pandhurna is a municipality in the district of Chhindwara, Madhya Pradesh. The city of Pandhurna is divided into 30 wards for which elections are held every 5 years. As of the 2011 Indian census, the municipality of Pandhurna have a population of 193,818, of which 100,657 were males while 93,156 were females.

The population of children ages 0–6 is 4,986, which is 10.96% of the total population of the municipality of Pandhurna. The female sex ratio is 937, as opposed to the Madhya Pradesh average of 931. Moreover, the child sex ratio in Pandhurna is around 959 compared to the state average of 918. The literacy rate of the city of Pandhurna is 87.03%, which is higher than the state average of 69.32%. In Pandhurna, male literacy is around 91.02% while female literacy rate is 82.76%.

The municipality of Pandhurna has total administration over 10,243 houses to which it supplies basic amenities like water and sewerage. It is also authorized to build roads within municipality limits and impose taxes on properties under its jurisdiction.

Castes
Schedule Caste (SC) constitutes 8.66% while Schedule Tribe (ST) were 6.02% of total population in Pandhurna (M).

Work profile
Out of the total population, 18,265 were engaged in work or business activity, of which 13,272 were male while 4,993 were female. "Worker" was defined in the 2017 Indian census as a person who does business, job, service, or cultivator and labour activity. Of total 18265 working population, 86.87% were engaged in Main Work while 13.13% of total workers were engaged in Marginal Work.

Economics
Pandhurna is a typical Indian village with farming as the major occupation. Many farmers grow oranges and cotton as the Kharif crop since the black soil is suitable for its production. Other crops are soybean, groundnut, cauliflower, gram and wheat. There are many edible oil mills here. The village also has a few oil and cotton mills and food processing plants, as well as many cotton ginning and pressing factories. Pandhurna is basically surrounded by Vidharbha, so the local language is Hindi and Marathi. Pandhurna is also known for orange farms; oranges are sold in the markets of Nagpur.

Gotmar Mela
Gotmar literally means stone throwing ('got' = stone and 'mar' = beat). "Gotmar Mela" was celebrated every year on the second day of Bhadrapad, which is New Moon day, on the banks of the Jam River. A long tree was erected in the middle of the river with a flag at its very top. The residents of the villages of Savargaon and Pandhurna gathered on either bank of the river, and started pelting stones at the persons of the opposite village who tried to cross into the middle of the river and remove the flag on top of the tree trunk. The village whose resident succeeds in removing the flag would be considered victorious. The whole activity happened amidst the chanting of the sacred name of "Chandi MAta Ki Jay." People were often left either dead or injured, so the festival was banned in 2009 and 2011, after failed attempts in 2001 and 2002 to get the villagers to use rubber balls instead of stones.

Nearby places of interes

1) Dadaji Maharaj Tapriya Teen Sher Chowk Near Nagar Palika Pandhurna

2) Gayatri Mata Mandir Jalaram Ward Pandhurna

3) Sai Tekdi Temple Pandhurna

4) Bhawani Mata Mandir Sawargaon Pandhurna

5) Ganesh Mandir Radhakrish ward Pandhurna

6) Shiv Shankar BADA Mahadeo Temple Warud Road Pandhurna

7) Shani Mandir Warud Road Pandhurna

8) Durga Mata Mandir Railway Station Road Pandhurna

9) Dhangaori Baba Mandir Near Ghatode Farm's Gujarkhedi Road pandhurna

10) Santoshi Mata mandir, Pandhurna

11) Chandi Mata Mandir Ganesh Ward Pandhurna

12) GANESH MATH  Pandhurna

13) Gajanan Maharaj Mandir Sansthan pandhurna

14) Shiv Mandir Shankar nagar Pandhurna

15) Kali mata Mandir & Dadaji Darbar Near Subhash ward Near Petrol Pump Pandhurna

16) Satwa mata Mandir Jalaram Ward Pandhurna

17) JUNA Pandhurna Prachin Shivalay seva Sanstha Samiti JUNA Pandhurna Jawahar Ward Pandhurna

18) GUNWANT baba Devsthan Khari Ward Pandhurna

19) Shri Ram Mandir Gujri Chowk pandhurna

20) Vitthal Mandir Bramhni Pandhari ward Pandhurna

21) Ram Mandir Ram Dhakka / Ram ghat Pandhurna

22) Sai Kutiya Near Gujri Bazar pandhurna

23) Shri Sant Jagnade Maharaj Sansthan Sawargaon Peth Pandhurna

24) Sharda Mata Madir Gujarkhedi Road Pandhurna

25) Gurudeo Sewa Mandal Jaystambh Chowk Pandhurna

26) Hanuman Mandir santoshi mandir Pandhurna

27) Jay shri Narayan deo Mandir sansthan Sawargaon peth Pandhurna

28) Karnya Bawa Hanuman Mandir Jatba ward Pandhurna

29) shiv Mandir MPEB Colony Pandhurna

30) Bhawani mandir Mang Pura Pandhurna

31) Ramdeo Baba Mandir Near Sargam Talkies Pandhurna

32) Bhakre Maharaj Sansthan Ambada Road Near Water Filter Junewani pandhurna

33) Jalaram Mandir Main Road Pandhurna

34) Jain Mandir Bus stand & Sharda Market Pandhurna

35) GURUDWARA gurunanak ward Pandhurna

References

Cities and towns in Chhindwara district

2)https://m.bhaskarhindi.com/news/heart-beating-of-dargah-in-pandurna-maharashtra